The Azalea Invitational is an annual amateur golf tournament. It has been played since 1946 at the Country Club of Charleston in Charleston, South Carolina. Several past champions have subsequently gained membership to the PGA Tour, including major champion Webb Simpson.

Winners

2022 Luke Clanton
2021 Abel Gallegos
2020 Mateo Fernández de Oliveira
2019 No tournament – hosted U.S. Women's Open
2018 Cole Hammer
2017 Chris Petefish
2016 Andy Zhang
2015 Todd White
2014 Will Murphy
2013 Austin Langdale
2012 Matthew NeSmith
2011 Pan Cheng-tsung
2010 Tyson Alexander
2009 Tyson Alexander
2008 Zack Sucher
2007 Webb Simpson
2006 No tournament – course restoration
2005 Nathan J. Smith
2004 Webb Simpson
2003 Spencer Levin
2002 D. J. Trahan
2001 Casey Wittenberg
2000 David Eger
1999 David Eger
1998 Jeff Knox
1997 John Engler
1996 Ryuji Imada
1995 Kelly Miller
1994 Mike Bright
1993 Frank Ford III
1992 Frank Ford III
1990–91 No tournament – Hurricane Hugo damage
1989 Frank Ford III
1988 Frank Ford III
1987 Hugh Royer III
1986 Frank Ford III
1985 John Inman
1984 Randy Sonnier
1983 John Finnin
1982 Frank Ford III
1981 David Lane
1980 Jim Burgess
1979 Bill Britton
1978 Ken Green
1977 Vance Heafner
1976 Buddy Alexander
1975 Skip Dunaway
1974 George Burns
1973 Bob Bryant
1972 Wally Kuchar
1971 Jim Belton
1970 Leroy Rabon
1969 Dick Siderowf
1968 Dick Horne
1967 R. H. Watson
1966 Curtis Wagner
1965 Curtis Wagner
1964 Charlie Smith
1963 Bill Christian
1962 Dave Smith
1961 Billy Joe Patton
1960 Dale Morey
1959 Dave Smith
1958 Charlie Smith
1957 Billy Thornton
1956 Mickey Gallagher
1955 Bobby Hackett
1954 Hobart Manley
1953 Hobart Manley
1952 Frank Ford, Sr.
1951 Moultrie McKevlin
1950 Frank Ford, Sr.
1949 Ben Goodes
1948 Ben Goodes
1947 Frank Ford, Sr.
1946 Frank Ford, Sr.

External links
Official site
List of winners

Amateur golf tournaments in the United States
Golf in South Carolina
Sports in Charleston, South Carolina
1946 establishments in South Carolina
Recurring sporting events established in 1946
Sports competitions in South Carolina
Events in Charleston, South Carolina